Tudorel Pelin (born 15 January 1969) is a retired Romanian football player.

Honours
Dacia Unirea Brăila
Cupa României runner-up: 1992–93

References

1969 births
Living people
Sportspeople from Brăila
Romanian footballers
Association football defenders
AFC Dacia Unirea Brăila players
ASC Oțelul Galați players
Liga I players
Romanian football managers
ASC Oțelul Galați managers